Regional elections were held in some regions of Italy during 1993. These included:

Aosta Valley on 6 June
Friuli-Venezia Giulia on 6 June
Trentino-Alto Adige on 21 November

Elections in Italian regions
1993 elections in Italy